The black and rufous elephant shrew (Rhynchocyon petersi), the black and rufous sengi, or the Zanj elephant shrew is one of the 17 species of elephant shrew found only in Africa. It is native to the lowland montane and dense forests of Kenya and Tanzania.

Distribution and habitat

The forests of the Eastern Arc Mountains are critical habitats for R. petersi. The Chome Forest Reserve in Tanzania is an isolated, and largely undisturbed, habitat for the shrews. Populations densities in the Chome area are significantly lower than the surrounding areas, home to approximately 2700 R. petersi, and is thought to be the result of restricted migration and illegal human activity. It was once listed by the IUCN Red List as vulnerable, but has since been changed to a status of least concern. However, its numbers are reportedly declining; suffering from severe forest fragmentation and degradation from human expansion.

Diet and behaviour

It eats insects such as beetles, termites, and centipedes, using its proboscis to dig them from the soil and its tongue to lick them up. Like most elephant shrews, it lives in monogamous pairs, defending hectare-sized territories. It typically builds ground level nests for shelter requiring dry leaf litter often at the base of trees.

Elephant shrews in zoological gardens
Several zoos have begun breeding this elephant shrew, including seven in Europe, such as the Prague and Wrocław zoos, as well as zoos in the United States like the Philadelphia Zoo. Two black and rufous elephant shrew males were born on February 4, 2007, at the National Zoo in Washington, D.C.

References

External links

black and rufous elephant shrew
Mammals of Kenya
Mammals of Tanzania
black and rufous elephant shrew